Alun is a Welsh variant of the masculine given name Alan. Notable people with the name include:

Ailín I, Earl of Lennox, also spelled Alún, 12th century ruler of Lennox, Scotland
Alun Anderson (born 1948), Welsh journalist
Alun Armstrong (disambiguation)
Alun Cairns (born 1970), Welsh politician
Alun Davies (disambiguation)
Alun Evans (disambiguation)
Alun Francis (born 1943), Welsh conductor
Alun Hoddinott (1929–2008), Welsh composer of classical music
Alun Jones (disambiguation)
Alun Lewis (disambiguation)
Alun Michael (born 1943), Welsh politician
Alun Owen (1925–1994), British screenwriter best known for the screenplay of The Beatles' film A Hard Day's Night
Alun Pask (1937–1995), Wales international rugby union player and captain
Alun Pugh (born 1955), Welsh politician
Alun Thomas (1926–1991), rugby union player for Wales
John Blackwell (Alun) (1797–1841), Welsh-language poet who used the bardic name Alun

See also
An unrelated name is
Alan Gua (Mongolian: Alun Gua), mythical figure in The Secret History of the Mongols

Welsh masculine given names